Journalology (also known as publication science) is the scholarly study of all aspects of the academic publishing process. The field seeks to improve the quality of scholarly research by implementing evidence-based practices in academic publishing. The term "journalology" was coined by Stephen Lock, the former editor-in-chief of the BMJ. The first Peer Review Congress, held in 1989 in Chicago, Illinois, is considered a pivotal moment in the founding of journalology as a distinct field. The field of journalology has been influential in pushing for study pre-registration in science, particularly in clinical trials. Clinical trial registration is now expected in most countries. Journalology researchers also work to reform the peer review process.

History

The earliest scientific journals were founded in the seventeenth century. While most early journals used peer review, peer review did not become common practice in medical journals until after World War II. The scholarly publishing process (including peer review) did not arise by scientific means, and still suffers from problems with reliability (consistency and dependability), such as a lack of uniform standards, and validity (well-founded, efficacious). Attempts to reform the academic publishing practice began to gain traction in the late twentieth century. The field of journalology was formally established in 1989.

See also 
 Journal ranking
 SCImago Journal Rank
 SCOPUS
 MEDLINE
 Metascience
 Open science
 Predatory publishing
 Beall's List
 Cabell's blacklist
 Bibliometrics
 Scientometrics

References

Further reading

External links
 Research Integrity and Peer Review – journal

Academic publishing
Metascience